Winsloe is a surname. Notable people with the surname include:

Alfred Winsloe (1852–1931), Royal Navy officer
Christa Winsloe (1888–1944), formerly Baroness Christa Hatvany de Hatvan, German-Hungarian novelist, playwright
Courtney Winsloe (born 1987), New Zealand cricketer

See also
Winslow (surname)